Trust the Man is a 2005 romantic comedy-drama film written and directed by Bart Freundlich. The film is set in New York and centers around two couples as they deal with relationship issues such as intimacy and commitment.

Plot
The film centers around four best friends: Married couple Tom and Rebecca and longtime relationship partners Tobey and Elaine. The film follows the two couples as they face trials and temptations in their relationships. 

Tom, after feeling a lack of intimacy with his wife, meets a divorced mother at his sons school. Rebecca, a film actress making her stage debut, meets a younger actor who shows infatuation for her named Jasper. Tobey, who does not show interest in settling down for marriage or kids, runs into an old fling from college named Faith. Elaine, after confronting Tobey about wanting to get married and have a family, meets several suitors throughout the film.

The story follows Tom and Tobey as they attempt to mend their relationships with their partners.

Cast

 David Duchovny as Tom Pollack
 Julianne Moore as Rebecca Pollack
 Billy Crudup as Tobey
 Maggie Gyllenhaal as Elaine
 Eva Mendes as Faith Faison
 Garry Shandling as Dr. Beekman
 Ellen Barkin as Norah
 Dagmara Domińczyk as Pamela
 Justin Bartha as Jasper Bernard
 Sterling K. Brown as Rand
 James LeGros as Dante
 Glenn Fitzgerald as Goren
 David Greenspan as Francis
 Paul Hecht as Amis
 Jim Gaffigan as Gordon
 Jayne Houdyshell as Support Group Leader
 Kate Jennings Grant as Support Group Woman
 Brian Tarantina as Crazy Hair Driver
 Noelle Beck as Flight Attendant
 Bob Balaban as Tobey's Therapist (uncredited)
 John Carroll Lynch as Doctor (deleted scene)

Release
Trust the Man premiered at the 2005 Toronto International Film Festival and was picked up by Fox Searchlight Pictures for distribution.

The film opened in the United States on August 18, 2006.

Reception
, Trust the Man holds a 28% approval rating on Rotten Tomatoes, based on 102 reviews with an average rating of 4.52/10. The website's critics consensus reads: "What aspires to be a sophisticated, unconventional romantic comedy turns out to be a contrivance-filled pretender to other, better films of its genre." Another review aggregator, Metacritic, gives the film a 43/100 approval rating based on 30 critics' reviews.

Michael Rechtshaffen of The Hollywood Reporter praised the film, saying "Both geographically and thematically speaking, writer-director Freundlich finds himself on vintage Woody Allen turf here -- as in the "Manhattan"/"Husbands and Wives" Woody Allen -- while still managing to lend the production a unique voice of its own. And Allen would've killed for Freundlich's terrific cast." Liz Beardsworth of Empire gave the film 3 out of 5 stars and wrote "Freundlich’s retread gleans new colour thanks to his sparkling dialogue, the urbane New York setting and great work from his superior cast, all of whom flesh out their roles so that empathy with their respective plights comes easily."

Accolades

References

External links 
 
 
 
 

2005 films
2005 romantic comedy films
Films directed by Bart Freundlich
Films scored by Clint Mansell
Fox Searchlight Pictures films
American romantic comedy films
Sidney Kimmel Entertainment films
2000s English-language films
2000s American films